Benjamin Youla (born 12 November 1975) is a retired sprinter from Republic of the Congo who specialised in the 400 metres. He represented his country at the 2000 Summer Olympics as well as two World Championships.

His personal bests in the event are 45.74 seconds outdoors (Fairfax 2001) and 49.15 seconds indoors (Houston 2004). Both are standing national record.

International competitions

References

1975 births
Living people
Republic of the Congo male sprinters
Athletes (track and field) at the 2000 Summer Olympics
Olympic athletes of the Republic of the Congo
World Athletics Championships athletes for the Republic of the Congo
Athletes (track and field) at the 1999 All-Africa Games
African Games competitors for the Republic of the Congo